The 1927 King's Birthday Honours in New Zealand, celebrating the official birthday of King George V, were appointments made by the King on the recommendation of the New Zealand government to various orders and honours to reward and highlight good works by New Zealanders. They were announced on 3 June 1927.

The recipients of honours are displayed here as they were styled before their new honour.

Knight Bachelor
 Lieutenant-Colonel Louis Edward Barnett    – of Dunedin; professor of surgery, University of Otago.
 The Honourable Āpirana Turupa Ngata – member of the House of Representatives and formerly member of the Executive Council.

Order of the British Empire

Commander (CBE)
Civil division
 George Jerningham Little – private secretary to the governor-general.

Companion of the Imperial Service Order (ISO)
 Frederick James Jones  – chairman of the Government Railway Board.

References

Birthday Honours
1927 awards
1927 in New Zealand
New Zealand awards